The Berheci is a right tributary of the river Bârlad in Romania. It discharges into the Bârlad in Poșta.

Towns and villages

The following towns and villages are situated along the river Berheci, from source to mouth: Obârșia, Izvoru Berheciului, Antohești, Tarnița, Oncești, Onceștii Vechi, Tomozia, Vultureni, Bosia, Lichitișeni, Banca, Calapodești, Tăvădărești, Dealu Morii, Negulești, Lărgășeni, Rădăcinești, Șerbănești, Corbița, Ocheșești, Feldioara, Corcioveni, Brăhășești, Nărtești and Gara Berheci.

Tributaries

The following rivers are tributaries to the river Berheci:

Left: Găureni, Plopeasca, Zeletin
Right: Dunavăț, Godinești, Găiceana, Negulești, Șerboaia, Abageru, Valea Boului

References

Rivers of Romania
Rivers of Bacău County
Rivers of Vrancea County
Rivers of Galați County